Prignitz – Ostprignitz-Ruppin – Havelland I is an electoral constituency (German: Wahlkreis) represented in the Bundestag. It elects one member via first-past-the-post voting. Under the current constituency numbering system, it is designated as constituency 56. It is located in northwestern Brandenburg, comprising the Prignitz district, Ostprignitz-Ruppin district, and most of the Havelland district.

Prignitz – Ostprignitz-Ruppin – Havelland I was created for the inaugural 1990 federal election after German reunification. Since 2021, it has been represented by Wiebke Papenbrock of the Social Democratic Party (SPD).

Geography
Prignitz – Ostprignitz-Ruppin – Havelland I is located in northwestern Brandenburg. As of the 2021 federal election, it comprises the entirety of the districts of Prignitz and Ostprignitz-Ruppin, as well as the municipality of Nauen and the Ämter of Friesack, Nennhausen, and Rhinow from the Havelland district.

History
Prignitz – Ostprignitz-Ruppin – Havelland I was created after German reunification in 1990, then known as Neuruppin – Kyritz – Wittstock – Pritzwalk – Perleberg. It acquired its current name in the 2002 election. In the 1990 through 1998 elections, it was constituency 271 in the numbering system. In the 2002 and 2005 elections, it was number 56. In the 2009 election, it was number 57. Since the 2013 election, it has been number 56.

Originally, the constituency comprised the districts of Neuruppin, Kyritz, Wittstock, Pritzwalk, and Perleberg. It acquired its current configuration in the 2002 election, as Neuruppin, Kyritz, and Wittstock were merged into the Ostprignitz-Ruppin district, and Pritzwalk and Perleberg merged into the Prignitz district. It also acquired the Ämter of Friesack and Rhinow from the Havelland district. In the 2017 election, the municipality of Nauen and the Amt of Nennhausen were transferred into the constituency.

Members
The constituency was first represented by Rosemarie Priebus of the Christian Democratic Union (CDU) from 1990 to 1994. It was won by the Social Democratic Party (SPD) in 1994, and represented by Ernst Bahr until 2009. Dagmar Ziegler of the SPD served a single term from 2009 until 2013, when it was won by CDU candidate Sebastian Steineke. Wiebke Papenbrock regained it for the SPD in 2021.

Election results

2021 election

2017 election

2013 election

2009 election

References

Federal electoral districts in Brandenburg
1990 establishments in Germany
Constituencies established in 1990